The RS400 is a light-weight sailing dinghy designed by Phil Morrison and manufactured by RS Sailing. The dinghy is sailed by two people and has a main, a jib and an asymmetric spinnaker. It has a PY of 948 and a D-PN of 82.3.

Performance and design
The RS400 is designed for a wide crew weight range. The interior layout is simple with the principle control lines being led to either side of the boat, so that either helm or crew can adjust the rig control settings. 

The light weight mast and mast bend can be controlled using a deck level screw and adjustable spreaders. Rake and sideways bend are further variable via the jib halyard. Both the main and jib are fully battened. The asymmetric spinnaker has an extending/retractable bowsprit that can be biased/offset/"rocked" to windward, allowing the RS400 to sail deeper angles offwind/downwind.

References

External links
 RS Sailing (Global HQ
 ISAF Connect to Sailing
 International RS Classes Association
 UK RS Association
 German RS Class Association
 Plachetnice RS400 - Asociace lodních tříd RS - moderní jachting a plachetnice RS v Čechách a na Slovensku

Dinghies
Boats designed by Phil Morrison
Sailboat types built by RS Sailing